Scary may refer to:

Arts and entertainment
 "Scary" (song), by Stormzy, 2016
 "Scary", a song by Björk, a B-side of "Bachelorette", 1997
 "Scary", a song by Britney Spears from Femme Fatale, 2011
 "Scary", a song by Megan Thee Stallion and Rico Nasty from Traumazine, 2022
 Scary, a village in the Shire, in works by J. R. R. Tolkien
 Little Miss Scary, a Little Miss character

Places
 Scary, West Virginia, U.S.

People
 Mel B, Melanie Brown (born 1975), stage name Scary Spice, English singer, member of Spice Girls
 Sherri Martel (1958–2007), ringname Scary Sherri, American professional wrestler
 Terry Taylor (born 1955), ringname "Scary" Terry Taylor, American professional wrestler
 The Scary Guy (born 1953), American motivational speaker

See also 
 
 Horror
 Scared (disambiguation)
 Scary Movie film series
 Scarry, a surname